Tony Kettle is a British architect best known for designing the Falkirk Wheel in Scotland and leading the RMJM team in Saint Petersburg, Russia. Kettle founded his own architecture firm "Kettle Collective" in 2012.

Kettle was the Group Design Principal of global firm RMJM, during this he acted as UK and European Director as well as International Group Design Director.

Early life

Kettle was educated at the Edinburgh College of Art.

Projects involved with
 Falkirk Wheel, UK
 Gazprom's new HQ, Lakhta Centre in 'Okhta City', St Petersburg, Russia
 Newcastle College Campus, UK
 The Dubai International Exhibition and Convention Centre and Finance Centre, UAE
 The Scottish Parliament, Edinburgh, UK
 City Palace Tower, Moscow, Russia
 The Ripple Retreat, Perthshire, UK for charity It's Good 2 Give!
 The Solar Innovation Centre, Dubai, UAE for Dubai Electricity and Water Authority
 Ecoliv Modular Residential Units, UK
 Naseej Affordable Housing, Middle East
 Mint Hotel, UK
 Woodhorn, Northumberland Museum, Archive and Country Park, UK
 Al Mouj, Oman
 Waterfront City, Beirut

The Millennium Falkirk Wheel
Kettle's team were appointed by British Waterways Scotland to  create a fully navigable waterway between Edinburgh and Glasgow.

The Falkirk Wheel was designed to reconnect the Forth of Clyde Canal with the Union Canal. The Wheel was completed in 2002 and was opened by Queen Elizabeth II.

Lakhta Centre
In December 2006, Gazprom and the St. Petersburg city authorities announced that the RMJM design had been chosen for what was then named the Okhta Centre in St. Petersburg.

Kettle and his team created a building that was said to revitalize an area of former industrial land. .

Kettle is in dispute with the Moscow architectural practice Gorproject and their lead architect Philipp Nikandrov over who is the architect of the building.

Kettle Collective
In 2012, Kettle and Colin Bone created design called Kettle Collective. Prior to founding his own firm, Kettle was the Group Design Principal of the global firm RMJM.  The new company focuses on architecture and other design services. Operating from Edinburgh, the company also has studios in Dubai and Oman.

Awards

Awards received by Kettle's designs include:

The Piers, Al Mouj, Muscat, Oman
 2015: Best Future Residential Building Design at the Cityscape Awards for Emerging Markets

Solar Innovation Centre], Dubai, UAE
 2013: International Design Competition
 2014: Best Future Leisure and Tourism building design at the Cityscape Awards for Emerging Markets
 2014: Selected for Royal Scottish Academy Open Exhibition for Architecture in Edinburgh, UK
 2014: Royal Scottish Academy Architecture Prize for outstanding work
 2014: Sustainable Project of the Year, The Middle East Architect Awards

The Joost Van Der Westhuizen Centre for Neurodegeneration, South Africa
 2014: Shortlisted for the Best Future Building of the Year, Drawing Board at the Leading European Architectural Forum

The Ripple Retreat], Perthshire, UK
 2014: Royal Scottish Academy Open Exhibition Staff Selection Award for Architecture

The Falkirk Wheel and Visitor Centre, Scotland 
 1991: Scottish Enterprise/RIAS Regeneration Design Award Commendation 
 2002: Glasgow Institute of Architects Award 'The People's Choice'
 2002: British Constructional Steelwork Association Structural Steel Award 
 2003: Civic Trust Award 
 2003: Dynamic Place Award Supreme Award
 2003: EAA Presidents Award 
 2003: Scottish Design Award Best Original Work

Performance Academy, Newcastle College, UK 
 2005: RIBA Award
 2005: Roses Design Awards - 'Bronze Award'
 2006: Civic Trust Commendation

Rye Hill House, Newcastle College, UK
 2007: Lord Mayor Design Award, Commendation Award for Conversion Refurbishment

New Scottish Parliament, Edinburgh, Scotland
 2005: Edinburgh Architecture Association, Centenary Medal 
 2005: European Union Prize for Contemporary Architecture Mies van der Rohe Award - Short-listed project
 2005: Scottish Design Awards 'Best Publicly Funded Building'
 2005: Scottish Design Awards 'Architecture Grand Prix'
 2005: Manuel de la Dehesa award
 2005: Royal Fine Art Commission - 'Urban & Landscape Specialist Award'
 2005: RIAS Andrew Doolan Award for Architecture, Best Building in Scotland 2005
 2005: RIBA Stirling Prize
 2005: Overall Winner in the Concrete Society's 
 2005 Awards for Outstanding Structures
 2006: Civic Trust Award
 2007: Architectural Ironmongery Specification Awards: Commendation

Publications
Tony Kettle's work has been published across a spectrum of works. These include:
 The 100 Most Amazing Places in Britain: A guide to the best of the best 
 Falkirk Wheel, Art and Engineering by RMJM

References

Scottish architects
Living people
Year of birth missing (living people)
Alumni of the Edinburgh College of Art